The 2014–15 Portland Trail Blazers season was the 45th season of the franchise in the National Basketball Association (NBA).
The Trail Blazers finished the regular-season record at 51–31, and captured the franchise's first Northwest division title. Unfortunately, the Trail Blazers were eliminated by the Memphis Grizzlies in the First Round in five games. Midway through the season Wesley Matthews suffered a season-ending Achilles tear. Following the season, LaMarcus Aldridge signed as a free agent with the San Antonio Spurs.

Preseason

Draft picks

The Trail Blazers did not have any picks in the 2014 NBA draft.

Regular season

Standings

Game log

Preseason

|- style="background:#fcc;"
| 1
| October 7
|@ Utah
| 
| Will Barton (12)
| Chris Kaman (4)
| Nicolas Batum (4)
| EnergySolutions Arena17,858
| 0–1
|- style="background:#fcc;"
| 2
| October 9
| Utah
|  
| LaMarcus Aldridge (22)
| Batum, Aldridge, Lopez & Kaman (6)
| Steve Blake (7)
| Moda Center14,468
| 0–2
|- style="background:#cfc;"
| 3
| October 12
| L.A. Clippers
| 
| Wesley Matthews (22)
| Chris Kaman (9)
| Steve Blake (7)
| Moda Center17,784
| 1–2
|- style="background:#cfc;"
| 4
| October 17
| Maccabi Haifa
|  
| Robin Lopez (13)
| Aldridge & Kaman (8)
| Wesley Matthews (6)
| Moda Center14,052
| 2–2
|- style="background:#cfc;"
| 5
| October 21
| @ Denver
| 
| LaMarcus Aldridge (20)
| Robin Lopez (12)
| Damian Lillard (6)
| Coors Event Center4,872
| 3–2
|- style="background:#fcc;"
| 6
| October 22
| @ L.A. Lakers
| 
| CJ McCollum (17)
| Thomas Robinson (7)
| Kaman, Crabbe & McCollum (3)
| Citizens Business Bank Arena7,174
| 3–3
|- style="background:#cfc;"
| 7
| October 24
| @ L.A. Clippers
|  
| Damian Lillard (21)
| Chris Kaman (9)
| Nicolas Batum (6)
| Staples Center15,069
|4–3

Regular season

|- style="background:#cfc;"
| 1
| October 29
| Oklahoma City
| 
| LaMarcus Aldridge (27)
| Robin Lopez (10)
| Nicolas Batum (6)
| Moda Center  19,441
| 1–0
|-style="background:#fcc;"
|2
|October 31
| @ Sacramento
|
|LaMarcus Aldridge (22)
|Damian Lillard (7)
|Batum & Blake (5)
|Sleep Train Arena 14,648
| 1–1

|- style="background:#fcc;"
| 3
| November 2
|  Golden State
| 
| LaMarcus Aldridge (26)
| LaMarcus Aldridge (13)
| Lillard & Blake (5)
| Moda Center 19,441
| 1–2
|- style="background:#cfc;"
| 4
| November 4
| Cleveland
| 
| Damian Lillard (27)
| Damian Lillard (9)
| Nicolas Batum (7)
| Moda Center19,441
| 2–2
|- style="background:#cfc;"
| 5
| November 6
|  Dallas
| 
| LaMarcus Aldridge (20)
| Nicolas Batum (9)
| Nicolas Batum (9)
| Moda Center19,441
| 3–2
|- style="background:#fcc;"
| 6
| November 8
| @ L.A. Clippers
| 
| Damian Lillard (25)
| LaMarcus Aldridge (10)
| Batum & Lillard (8)
| Staples Center19,060
| 3–3
|- style="background:#cfc;"
| 7
| November 9
| Denver
| 
| LaMarcus Aldridge (28)
| Lopez, Aldridge & Batum (9)
| Damian Lillard (7)
| Moda Center19,411
| 4–3
|- style="background:#cfc;"
| 8
| November 11
| Charlotte
| 
| Damian Lillard (29)
| LaMarcus Aldridge (14)
| Lillard & Matthews (7)
| Moda Center18,495
| 5–3
|- style="background:#cfc;"
| 9
| November 12
| @ Denver
| 
| Damian Lillard (27)
| Aldridge & Kaman (7)
| Damian Lillard (9)
| Pepsi Center12,611
| 6–3
|- style="background:#cfc;"
| 10
| November 15
| Brooklyn
| 
| Damian Lillard (28)
| Meyers Leonard (12)
| Damian Lillard (10)
| Moda Center 19,441
| 7–3
|- style="background:#cfc;"
|11
| November 17
| New Orleans
| 
| Damian Lillard (24)
| Chris Kaman (10)
| Lillard & Blake (7)
| Moda Center19,441
| 8–3
|- style="background:#cfc;"
| 12
| November 21
|  Chicago
| 
| Damian Lillard (21)
| LaMarcus Aldridge (9)
| Damian Lillard (9)
| Moda Center19,866
| 9–3
|- style="background:#cfc;"
| 13
| November 23
| @ Boston
| 
| LaMarcus Aldridge (20)
| LaMarcus Aldridge (14)
| Lillard & Blake (5)
| TD Garden16,692
| 10–3
|- style="background:#cfc;"
| 14
| November 24
| @ Philadelphia
| 
| LaMarcus Aldridge (33)
| LaMarcus Aldridge (11)
| Steve Blake (8)
| Wells Fargo Center11,094
| 11–3
|- style="background:#cfc;"
| 15
| November 26
| @ Charlotte
| 
| Wesley Matthews (28)
| LaMarcus Aldridge (14)
| Damian Lillard (7)
| Time Warner Cable Arena16,972
| 12–3
|- style="background:#fcc;"
| 16
| November 28
| Memphis
| 
| Wesley Matthews (26)
| Chris Kaman (11)
| Damian Lillard (9)
| Moda Center19,459
| 12–4
|- style="background:#cfc;"
| 17
| November 30
| Minnesota
| 
| LaMarcus Aldridge (26)
| LaMarcus Aldridge (15)
| Damian Lillard (8)
| Moda Center 18,843
| 13–4

|- style="background:#cfc;"
| 18
| December 2
| @ Denver
| 
| LaMarcus Aldridge (39)
| LaMarcus Aldridge (11)
| Nicolas Batum (13)
| Pepsi Center12,822
| 14–4
|- style="background:#cfc;"
| 19
| December 4
| Indiana
| 
| Damian Lillard (23)
| LaMarcus Aldridge (13)
| Nicolas Batum (5)
|  Moda Center 19,191
| 15–4
|- style="background:#cfc;"
| 20
| December 7
| @ New York
| 
| LaMarcus Aldridge (24)
| LaMarcus Aldridge (11)
| Nicolas Batum (7)
| Madison Square Garden19,812
| 16–4
|- style="background:#cfc;"
| 21
| December 9
| @ Detroit
| 
| LaMarcus Aldridge (23)
| Aldridge & Batum (11)
| Lillard & Blake (6)
| Palace of Auburn Hills12,813
| 17–4
|- style="background:#fcc;"
| 22
| December 10
| @ Minnesota
| 
| Damian Lillard (23)
| LaMarcus Aldridge (9)
| Nicolas Batum (6)
| Target Center 10,337
| 17–5
|- style="background:#fcc;"
| 23
| December 12
| @ Chicago
| 
| Aldridge & Lillard (35)
| LaMarcus Aldridge (9)
| Damian Lillard (6)
| United Center21,725
| 17–6
|- style="background:#cfc;"
| 24
| December 13
| @ Indiana
| 
| LaMarcus Aldridge (19)
| LaMarcus Aldridge (14)
| Steve Blake (7)
| Bankers Life Fieldhouse17,206
| 18–6
|- style="background:#cfc;"
| 25
| December 15
|  San Antonio
| 
| Aldridge & Lillard (23)
| LaMarcus Aldridge (14)
| Batum & Lillard (6)
| Moda Center19,441
| 19–6
|- style="background:#cfc;"
| 26
| December 17
|  Milwaukee
| 
| Damian Lillard (29)
| Thomas Robinson (16)
| Damian Lillard (7)
| Moda Center19,495
| 20–6
|- style="background:#cfc;"
| 27
| December 19
| @ San Antonio
| 
| Damian Lillard (43)
| LaMarcus Aldridge (16)
| Damian Lillard (6)
| AT&T Center18,581
| 21–6
|- style="background:#cfc;"
| 28
| December 20
| @ New Orleans
| 
| LaMarcus Aldridge (27)
| LaMarcus Aldridge (12)
| Damian Lillard (7)
| Smoothie King Center16,079
| 22–6
|- style="background:#fcc;"
| 29
| December 22
| @ Houston
| 
| Damian Lillard (18)
| Chris Kaman (6)
| Batum, Lillard & McCollum (3)
| Toyota Center18,316
| 22–7
|- style="background:#cfc;"
| 30
| December 23
| @ Oklahoma City
| 
| Damian Lillard (40)
| Aldridge & Kaman (9)
| Damian Lillard (11)
| Chesapeake Energy Arena18,203
| 23–7
|- style="background:#cfc;"
| 31
| December 26
| Philadelphia
| 
| Damian Lillard (28)
| Joel Freeland (17)
| Damian Lillard (9)
| Moda Center19,972
| 24–7
|- style="background:#cfc;"
| 32
| December 28
| New York
| 
| Wesley Matthews (28)
| Joel Freeland (10)
| Damian Lillard (6)
| Moda Center19,800
| 25–7
|- style="background:#cfc;"
| 33
| December 30
|  Toronto
| 
| Damian Lillard (26)
| LaMarcus Aldridge (13)
| Damian Lillard (9)
| Moda Center20,053
| 26–7

|- style="background:#fcc;"
| 34
| January 3
|  Atlanta
| 
| LaMarcus Aldridge (30)
| LaMarcus Aldridge (12)
| Damian Lillard (7)
| Moda Center19,829
| 26–8
|- style="background:#cfc;"
| 35
| January 5
| L.A. Lakers
| 
| Damian Lillard (39)
| Meyers Leonard (12)
| Damian Lillard (5)
| Moda Center19,827
| 27–8
|- style="background:#cfc;"
| 36
| January 8
|  Miami
| 
| LaMarcus Aldridge (24)
| LaMarcus Aldridge (12)
| Matthews & Blake (5)
| Moda Center19,441
| 28–8
|- style="background:#cfc;"
| 37
| January 10
| Orlando
| 
| LaMarcus Aldridge (25)
| Nicolas Batum (10)
| Damian Lillard (5)
| Moda Center19,546
| 29–8
|- style="background:#cfc;"
| 38
| January 11
| @ L.A. Lakers
| 
| Damian Lillard (34)
| Chris Kaman (12)
| Damian Lillard (7)
| Staples Center18,997
| 30–8
|- style="background:#fcc;"
| 39
| January 14
| L.A. Clippers
| 
| LaMarcus Aldridge (37)
| LaMarcus Aldridge (12)
| Nicolas Batum (6)
| Moda Center19,441
| 30–9
|- style="background:#fcc;"
| 40
| January 16
| @ San Antonio
| 
| LaMarcus Aldridge (24)
| LaMarcus Aldridge (8)
| Damian Lillard (5)
| AT&T Center18,581
| 30–10
|- style="background:#fcc;"
| 41
| January 17
| @ Memphis
| 
| LaMarcus Aldridge (32)
| Chris Kaman (11)
| Steve Blake (8)
| FedEx Forum18,119
| 30–11
|- style="background:#cfc;"
| 42
| January 19
|  Sacramento
| 
| Damian Lillard (22)
| Lillard & Robinson (6)
| Damian Lillard (5)
| Moda Center19,441
| 31–11
|- style="background:#fcc;"
| 43
| January 21
| @ Phoenix
| 
| Nicolas Batum (27)
| Nicolas Batum (10)
| Damian Lillard (6)
| US Airways Center16,703
| 31–12
|- style="background:#fcc;"
| 44
| January 22
|  Boston
| 
| Damian Lillard (21)
| Thomas Robinson (12)
| Damian Lillard (7)
| Moda Center19,567
| 31–13
|- style="background:#cfc;"
| 45
| January 24
| Washington
| 
| LaMarcus Aldridge (26)
| Chris Kaman (10)
| Damian Lillard (7)
| Moda Center19,775
| 32–13
|-style="background:#fcc;"
|46
|January 28
| @ Cleveland
| 
| LaMarcus Aldridge (38)
| Chris Kaman (13)
| Nicolas Batum (7)
| Quicken Loans Arena20,562
| 32–14
|- style="background:#fcc;"
| 47
| January 30
| @ Atlanta
| 
| LaMarcus Aldridge (37)
| LaMarcus Aldridge (11)
| Damian Lillard (11)
| Philips Arena19,018
| 32–15
|- style="background:#fcc;"
| 48
| January 31
| @ Milwaukee
| 
| Lillard & Matthews (19)
| LaMarcus Aldridge (13)
| Damian Lillard (9) 
| BMO Harris Bradley Center18,717
| 32–16

|- style="background:#cfc;"
| 49
| February 3
|  Utah
| 
| Damian Lillard (25)
| LaMarcus Aldridge (11)
| Batum & Lillard (6)
| Moda Center19,441
| 33–16
|- style="background:#cfc;"
| 50
| February 5
|  Phoenix
| 
| Nicolas Batum (20)
| LaMarcus Aldridge (13)
| Nicolas Batum (7)
| Moda Center19,488
| 34–16
|- style="background:#fcc;"
| 51
| February 7
| @ Dallas
| 
| Damian Lillard (26)
| LaMarcus Aldridge (14)
| Blake & Lillard (7)
| American Airlines Center20,398
| 34–17
|- style="background:#cfc;"
| 52
| February 8
| @ Houston
| 
| LaMarcus Aldridge (24)
| Nicolas Batum (7)
| Damian Lillard (5)
| Toyota Center18,243
| 35-17
|- style="background:#cfc;"
| 53
| February 11
| L.A. Lakers
| 
| Wesley Matthews (20)
| LaMarcus Aldridge (12)
| Damian Lillard (8)
| Moda Center19,585
| 36–17
|- align="center"
|colspan="9" bgcolor="#bbcaff"|All-Star Break
|- style="background:#fcc;"
| 54
| February 20
| @ Utah
| 
| Damian Lillard (19)
| LaMarcus Aldridge (9)
| Nicolas Batum (3)
| EnergySolutions Arena19,911
| 36-18
|- style="background:#fcc;"
| 55
| February 22
| Memphis
| 
| Damian Lillard (18)
| Nicolas Batum (10)
| Damian Lillard (7)
| Moda Center19,782
| 36-19
|- style="background:#cfc;"
| 56
| February 25
| San Antonio
| 
| Wesley Matthews (31)
| LaMarcus Aldridge (13)
| Nicolas Batum (9)
| Moda Center19,650
| 37-19
|- style="background:#cfc;"
| 57
| February 27
| Oklahoma City
| 
| Aldridge & Lillard (29)
| LaMarcus Aldridge (16)
| Aldridge & Lillard (5)
| Moda Center19,962
| 38-19

|- style="background:#cfc;"
| 58
| March 1
|  @Sacramento
| 
| Damian Lillard (31) 
| LaMarcus Aldridge (15)
| Damian Lillard (7) 
| Sleep Train Arena16,776
| 39–19
|- style="background:#cfc;"
| 59
| March 4
| @ L.A. Clippers
| 
| LaMarcus Aldridge (29)
| Damian Lillard (18)
| Nicolas Batum (8)
| Staples Center19,060
| 40-19
|- style="background:#cfc;"
| 60
| March 5
| Dallas
| 
| LaMarcus Aldridge (17)
| Aldridge & Batum (12)
| Nicolas Batum (6)
| Moda Center19,499
| 41-19
|- style="background:#fcc;"
| 61
| March 7
| @ Minnesota
| 
| Damian Lillard (32)
| LaMarcus Aldridge (8)
| Damian Lillard (8)
| Target Center19,356
| 41-20
|- style="background:#cfc;"
| 62
| March 11
| Houston
| 
| LaMarcus Aldridge (26)
| LaMarcus Aldridge (14)
| Damian Lillard (8)
| Moda Center19,279
| 42–20
|- style="background:#cfc;"
| 63
| March 13
| Detroit
| 
| Damian Lillard (28)
| Nicolas Batum (8)
| Damian Lillard (9)
| Moda Center19,486
| 43–20
|- style="background:#cfc;"
| 64
| March 15
| @ Toronto
| 
| LaMarcus Aldridge (24)
| LaMarcus Aldridge (10)
| Nicolas Batum (12)
| Air Canada Centre19,800
| 44–20
|- style="background:#fcc;"
| 65
| March 16
| @ Washington
| 
| LaMarcus Aldridge (24)
| Nicolas Batum (15)
| Damian Lillard (9)
| Verizon Center17,324
| 44–21
|- style="background:#fcc;"
| 66
| March 18
| @ Miami
| 
| LaMarcus Aldridge (34)
| LaMarcus Aldridge (12)
| Batum & Blake (6)
| American Airlines Center19,621
| 44–22
|- style="background:#fcc;"
| 67
| March 20
| @ Orlando
| 
| LaMarcus Aldridge (34)
| Nicolas Batum (11)
| Batum & Lillard (4)
| Amway Center16,203
| 44–23
|- style="background:#fcc;"
| 68
| March 21
| @ Memphis
| 
| Damian Lillard (27)
| Freeland & Lopez (12)
| Damian Lillard (7)
| FedEx Forum17,898
| 44–24
|- style="background:#fcc;"
| 69
| March 24
| Golden State
| 
| Damian Lillard (29)
| Lillard & Lopez (7)
| Blake & Lillard (5)
| Moda Center19,985
| 44-25
|- style="background:#cfc;"
| 70
| March 25
| @ Utah
| 
| Damian Lillard (23)
| LaMarcus Aldridge (9)
| Damian Lillard (12)
| EnergySolutions Arena19,911
| 45–25
|- style="background:#cfc;"
| 71
| March 27
| @ Phoenix
| 
| LaMarcus Aldridge (27)
| Chris Kaman (11)
| Nicolas Batum (5)
| US Airways Center17,219
| 46–25
|- style="background:#cfc;"
| 72
| March 28
| Denver
| 
| LaMarcus Aldridge (32)
| LaMarcus Aldridge (11)
| Damian Lillard (10)
| Moda Center19,769
| 47–25
|-style="background:#cfc;"
| 73
| March 30
| Phoenix
| 
| Damian Lillard (19)
| Aldridge & Kaman (7)
| Damian Lillard (7)
| Moda Center19,441
| 48–25

|- style="background:#fcc;"
| 74
| April 1
| L.A. Clippers
| 
| Nicolas Batum (21)
| Robin Lopez (8)
| Damian Lillard (10)
| Moda Center19,639
| 48–26
|- style="background:#cfc;"
| 75
| April 3
| @ L.A. Lakers
| 
| CJ McCollum (27)
| Nicolas Batum (10)
| Blake & Lillard (5)
| Staples Center18,997
| 49–26
|- style="background:#cfc;"
| 76
| April 4
| New Orleans
| 
| LaMarcus Aldridge (21)
| Aldridge & Lopez (12)
| Damian Lillard (4)
| Moda Center19,781
| 50–26
|- style="background:#fcc;"
| 77
| April 6
| @ Brooklyn
| 
| Damian Lillard (36)
| Meyers Leonard (15)
| Blake & Leonard (4)
| Barclays Center17,416
| 50–27
|- style="background:#cfc;"
| 78
| April 8
| Minnesota
| 
| LaMarcus Aldridge (24)
| LaMarcus Aldridge (13)
| Damian Lillard (6)
| Moda Center19,499
| 51–27
|- style="background:#fcc;"
| 79
| April 9
| @ Golden State
| 
| Damian Lillard (20)
| Nicolas Batum (10)
| Batum & Lillard (8)
| Oracle Arena19,596
| 51–28
|- style="background:#fcc;"
| 80
| April 11
|  Utah
| 
| Damian Lillard (28)
| CJ McCollum (8)
| Nicolas Batum (8)
| Moda Center19,908
| 51–29
|- style="background:#fcc;"
| 81
| April 13
| @ Oklahoma City
| 
| Meyers Leonard (24)
| Allen Crabbe (7)
| Damian Lillard (6)
| Chesapeake Energy Arena18,203
| 51–30
|- style="background:#fcc;"
| 82
| April 15
| @ Dallas
| 
| LaMarcus Aldridge (19)
| Meyers Leonard (9)
| Tim Frazier (10)
| American Airlines Center20,352
| 51–31

Playoffs

|- style="background:#fcc;"
| 1
| April 19
| @ Memphis
| 
| LaMarcus Aldridge (32)
| LaMarcus Aldridge (14)
| Batum, Blake (4)
| FedExForum18,119
| 0–1
|- style="background:#fcc;"
| 2
| April 22
| @ Memphis
| 
| LaMarcus Aldridge (24)
| LaMarcus Aldridge (14)
| Nicolas Batum (7)
| FedExForum18,119
| 0–2
|- style="background:#fcc;"
| 3
| April 25
| Memphis
| 
| Nicolas Batum (27)
| LaMarcus Aldridge (7)
| Damian Lillard (9)
| Moda Center19,945
| 0–3
|- style="background:#cfc;"
| 4
| April 27
| Memphis
| 
| Damian Lillard (32)
| Nicolas Batum (13)
| Damian Lillard (7)
| Moda Center19,541
| 1–3
|- style="background:#fcc;"
| 5
| April 29
| @ Memphis
| 
| CJ McCollum (33)
| Nicolas Batum (10)
| Nicolas Batum (7)
| FedExForum18,119
| 1–4

Player statistics

Summer League

|- align="center" bgcolor=""
|  || 5 || style=|5 || style=|33.0 || .479 || .345 || .700 || 3.2 || 2.0 || 1.8 || 0.0 || style=|20.2
|- align="center" bgcolor="#f0f0f0"
|  || 5 || 4 || 31.8 || .377 || .227 || .882 || 6.4 || style=|3.0 || 1.2 || 0.0 || 14.4
|- align="center" bgcolor=""
|  || 3 || 3 || 27.7 || .429 || style=|.500 || .500 || 3.7 ||1.0 || 0.7 || style=|1.0 || 6.7
|- align="center" bgcolor="#f0f0f0"
|  || 5 || 1 || 22.6 || .455 || .000 || style=|1.000 || 3.0 || 1.0 || 0.4 || 0.0 || 5.6
|- align="center" bgcolor=""
|  || 5 || 4 || 26.8 || .385 || .000 || .615 || 6.2 || 0.8 || 0.0 || 0.6 || 5.6
|- align="center" bgcolor="#f0f0f0"
|  || 3 || 3 || 28.3 || style=|.500 || .000 || .520 || style=|8.7 || 2.0 || style=|2.3 || 0.7 || 13.7
|}

Preseason

|- align="center" bgcolor=""
|  || 5 || 5 || style=|26.0 || .455 || .000 || .895 || 6.6 || 3.4 || 0.4 || 0.8 || style=|15.4
|- align="center" bgcolor="#f0f0f0"
|  || 5 || 5 || 24.2 || .449 || .400 || .882 || 2.4 || 2.8 || 1.2 || 0.0 || 13.4
|- align="center" bgcolor=""
|  || 6 || style=|6 || 24.8 || .500 || style=|.586 || .80 || 3.0 || 2.3 || 0.8 || 0.0 || 13.2
|- align="center" bgcolor="#f0f0f0"
|  || 7 || 2 || 18.6 || .608 || .000 || .900 || 6.7 || 1.4 || 0.4 || style=|1.6 || 10.1
|- align="center" bgcolor=""
|  || 7 || 1 || 22.1 || .407 || .333 || .950 || 2.4 || 1.7 || 1.1 || 0.0 || 10.0
|- align="center" bgcolor="#f0f0f0"
|  || 7 || 0 || 17.9 || .463 || .364 || .765 || 2.9 || 1.9 || 1.1 || 0.6 || 7.9
|- align="center" bgcolor=""
|  || 6 || style=|6 || 21.8 || .516 || .000 || .800 || style=|6.8 || 1.3 || 0.3 || 1.0 || 7.3
|- align="center" bgcolor="#f0f0f0"
|  || 6 || style=|6 || 25.7 || .410 || .250 || .857 || 5.3 || 3.7 || 0.5 || 0.2 || 7.2
|- align="center" bgcolor=""
|  || 6 || 0 || 14.3 || .469 || .400 || style=|1.000 || 3.8 ||1.2 || 0.2 || 0.5 || 7.0
|- align="center" bgcolor="#f0f0f0"
|  || 7 || 1 || 12.1 || style=|.632 || .500 || .750 || 0.9 || 0.6 || 0.3 || 0.1 || 4.9
|- align="center" bgcolor=""
|  || 7 || 0 || 12.3 || .385 || .000 || .714 || 3.7 || 0.9 || 0.3 || 0.1 || 4.3
|- align="center" bgcolor="#f0f0f0"
|  || 7 || 1 || 12.9 || .368 || .125 || .857 || 1.0 || 0.9 || style=|1.4 || 0.3 || 3.9
|- align="center" bgcolor=""
|  || 5 || 1 || 21.2 || .304 || .231 || style=|1.000 || 2.0 || style=|5.0 || 0.6 || 0.0 || 3.8
|- align="center" bgcolor="#f0f0f0"
|  || 7 || 1 || 10.7 || .350 || .000 || .375 || 3.3 || 0.3 || 0.4 || 0.3 || 2.4
|- align="center" bgcolor="#f0f0f0"
|  || 5 || 0 || 4.6 || .500 || .000 || style=|1.000 || 0.4 || 0.0 || 0.0 || 0.0 || 2.0
|}

Regular season

|- align="center" bgcolor=""
|  || 5 || 0 || 27.7 || .452 || .438 || .786 || 2.6 || 1.6 || 0.6 || 0.0 || 9.2
|- align="center" bgcolor="#f0f0f0"
|  || 71 || 71 || 36.2 || .452 || .373 || .866 || style=|10.5 || 1.8 || 0.8 || 1.1 || style=|23.4
|- align="center" bgcolor=""
|  || 30 || 0 || 10.0 || .380 || .222 || .667 || 1.1 || 0.9 || 0.4 || 0.1 || 3.0
|- align="center" bgcolor="#f0f0f0"
|  || 71 || 71 || 34.0 || .389 || .289 || .853 || 5.5 || 4.8 || 1.1 || 0.7 || 9.3
|- align="center" bgcolor=""
|  || 81 || 0 || 20.1 || .377 || .348 || .727 || 1.8 || 3.6 || 0.5 || 0.1 || 4.5
|- align="center" bgcolor="#f0f0f0"
|  || 10 || 0 || 7.6 || .450 || .545 || .000 || 2.0 || 0.1 || 0.1 || 0.1 || 2.4
|- align="center" bgcolor=""
|  || 51 || 9 || 12.5 || .426 || .386 || .889 || 1.1 || 0.8 || 0.3 || 0.4 || 2.9
|- align="center" bgcolor="#f0f0f0"
|  || 48 || 8 || 13.2 || .474 || .000 || .842 || 4.4 || 0.4 || 0.2 || 0.5 || 3.4
|- align="center" bgcolor=""
|  || 54 || 2 || 3.6 || .500 || style=|1.000 || .500 || 0.0 || 0.0 || 0.5 || 0.0 || 2.0
|- align="center" bgcolor="#f0f0f0"
|  || 74 || 13 || 20.0 || .492 || .000 || .701 || 6.6 || 0.9 || 0.2 || 0.9 || 8.7
|- align="center" bgcolor=""
|  || 55 || 7 || 14.8 || style=|.523 || .452 || style=|.905 || 4.1 || 0.5 || 0.2 || 0.2 || 5.7
|- align="center" bgcolor="#f0f0f0"
|  || 82 || style=|82 || style=|36.3 || .432 || .338 || .859 || 4.8 || style=|6.2 || style=|1.4 || 0.3 || 21.3
|- align="center" bgcolor=""
|  || 59 || 59 || 28.4 || .519 || .000 || .778 || 7.1 || 1.1 || 0.3 || style=|1.5 || 9.7
|- align="center" bgcolor="#f0f0f0"
|  || 60 || style=| 60 || 34.0 || .449 || .391 || .748 || 3.7 || 2.3 || 1.3 || 0.2 || 16.1
|- align="center" bgcolor=""
|  || 62 || 3 || 12.4 || .391 || .403 || .700 || 1.0 || 0.8 || 0.5 || 0.1 || 4.9
|- align="center" bgcolor="#f0f0f0"
|  || 32 || 4 || 12.2 || .516 || .000 || .438 || 4.1 || 0.3 || 0.5 || 0.3 || 3.6
|- align="center" bgcolor=""
|  || 48 || 2 || 10.8 || .364 || .397 || .800 || 2.1 || 0.8 || 0.4 || 0.2 || 3.8
|-
|}

Injuries

Roster

Transactions

Trades

Free agents

Re-signed

Additions

Subtractions

Awards

References

External links

 2014–15 Portland Trail Blazers preseason at ESPN
 2014–15 Portland Trail Blazers regular season at ESPN

Portland Trail Blazers seasons
Portland Trail Blazers
Portland Trail Blazers 2014
Portland Trail Blazers 2014
Port
Port